Annweiler am Trifels is a Verbandsgemeinde ("collective municipality") in the Südliche Weinstraße district, in Rhineland-Palatinate, Germany. The seat of the municipality is in Annweiler am Trifels.

The Verbandsgemeinde Annweiler am Trifels consists of the following Ortsgemeinden ("local municipalities"): 

 Albersweiler 
 Annweiler am Trifels
 Dernbach 
 Eußerthal 
 Gossersweiler-Stein 
 Münchweiler am Klingbach 
 Ramberg 
 Rinnthal 
 Silz 
 Völkersweiler 
 Waldhambach
 Waldrohrbach 
 Wernersberg 

Verbandsgemeinde in Rhineland-Palatinate
Palatinate Forest
Südliche Weinstraße